Dilwar may refer to:

 Dilwar Khan (1937–2013), Bangladeshi poet
 Dilwar Khan (1585-1666), Muslim ruler of Sandwip
 Dilwar Hussain (born 1970), British academic and consultant on social policy, Muslim identity and Islamic reform
 Dilwar, a 2019 Bhojpuri movie starring Sanjay Pandey
 Saint Dilwar, a Welsh saint

See also
 Dilawar (disambiguation)